Helena Straková (born 22 April 1975) is a Czech swimmer. She competed in two events at the 1992 Summer Olympics.

References

1975 births
Living people
Czech female swimmers
Olympic swimmers of Czechoslovakia
Swimmers at the 1992 Summer Olympics
Sportspeople from Liberec